Araxoceratidae is an extinct family of ceratitid ammonites,  cephalopods that were found throughout the world.  They arose during the Permian and died out during the early Triassic.  The species of the type genus Araxoceras are used as markers for various Permian epochs.

References
 The Paleobiology Database Accessed on 9/24/07

Otoceratina
Permian animals
Triassic ammonites
Permian first appearances
Early Triassic extinctions
Ceratitida families